Keith Jarrett at the Blue Note The complete recordings is a 6-CD box set live album by Keith Jarrett's Standards Trio recorded at the Blue Note Jazz Club in New York City in 1994 and released by ECM Records in October 1995. Totaling more than seven hours of music (applause included), the multi-CD box documents the "complete" performances of a three-day / double-set Friday to Sunday stand.

Reception 
The Allmusic review by Scott Yanow awarded the set 5 stars, stating: "Never mind that this same group has already had ten separate releases since 1983; this box is still well worth getting.... Throughout the three nights at the Blue Note, the interplay among the musicians is consistently outstanding. Those listeners concerned about Jarrett's tendency to 'sing along' with his piano have little to fear for, other than occasional shouts and sighs, he wisely lets his piano do the talking."

Journalist Jon Pareles of The New York Times attended a set on June 3 recalling the "three-night engagement was Mr. Jarrett's first New York club date in 11 years, and for it he turned the club into a miniature concert hall; smoking was prohibited, and no food or drinks were served during the set". He compared Jarrett's approach with the one followed by Bill Evans and continued he "is a master of playing gently, and he refuses to push. Often, he would let a line grow softer as it climbed, creating quiet peaks. The music whispered and glimmered, seeking a pure, incorporeal song".

In the recording technique camp, Stereophile's Wes Phillips states that the sound is "Amazing" and that "a piano trio recorded this well makes an impressive demonstration disc. DeJohnette is placed near the right speaker, Jarrett near the left, and Peacock stands well back in the middle—hey! where'd he come from? The instruments are prominently featured, but there's enough room acoustic to convince you this really took place somewhere. Somewhere intimate—not merely small, but close and personal."

In 1996, the box-set was awarded with "Album of The Year" in the Critics Poll held by Down Beat magazine.

Track listing 
As Wes Phillips recollects in his review at Stereophile:

  
Disc One: June 3, 1994 (first set) [Friday]
 "In Your Own Sweet Way" (Dave Brubeck) - 17:59
 "How Long Has This Been Going On?" (George Gershwin, Ira Gershwin) - 9:09
 "While We're Young" (Alec Wilder) - 11:01
 "Partners" (Keith Jarrett) - 8:28
 "No Lonely Nights" (Keith Jarrett) - 7:16
 "Now's the Time" (Charlie Parker) - 8:30
 "Lament" (J. J. Johnson) - 7:09

Disc Two: June 3, 1994 (second set) [Friday]
 "I'm Old Fashioned" (Jerome Kern, Johnny Mercer) - 10:36
 "Everything Happens to Me" (Tom Adair, Matt Dennis) - 11:49
 "If I Were a Bell (Frank Loesser) - 11:26
 "In the Wee Small Hours of the Morning" (Bob Hilliard, David Mann) - 8:45
 "Oleo" (Sonny Rollins) - 8:03
 "Alone Together" (Howard Dietz, Arthur Schwartz) - 11:20
 "Skylark" (Hoagy Carmichael, Johnny Mercer) - 6:36
 "Things Ain't What They Used to Be" (Mercer Ellington, Ted Persons) - 7:53

Disc Three: June 4, 1994 (first set) [Saturday]
 "Autumn Leaves" (Joseph Kosma, Jacques Prévert, Johnny Mercer) - 26:43
 "Days of Wine and Roses" (Henry Mancini, Johnny Mercer) - 11:30
 "Bop-Be" (Keith Jarrett) - 6:18
 "You Don't Know What Love Is/Muezzin" (Gene DePaul, Don Ray/Jarrett) - 20:31
 "When I Fall in Love" (Edward Heyman, Victor Young) - 5:42

Disc Four: June 4, 1994 (second set) [Saturday] 
 "How Deep Is the Ocean?" (Irving Berlin) - 11:25
 "Close Your Eyes" (Bernice Petkere) - 9:27
 "Imagination" (Johnny Burke, Jimmy Van Heusen) - 8:44
 "I'll Close My Eyes" (Buddy Kaye, Billy Reid) - 10:11
 "I Fall in Love Too Easily/The Fire Within" (Jule Styne, Sammy Cahn/Keith Jarrett) - 27:08
 "Things Ain't What They Used to Be" (Mercer Ellington, Ted Persons) - 8:58

Disc Five: June 5, 1994 (first set) [Sunday] 
 "On Green Dolphin Street/Joy Ride" (Bronisław Kaper, Ned Washington/Jarrett) - 21:07
 "My Romance" (Lorenz Hart, Richard Rodgers) - 9:40
 "Don't Ever Leave Me" (Oscar Hammerstein II, Jerome Kern) - 5:08
 "You'd Be So Nice to Come Home To" (Cole Porter) - 6:58
 "La Valse Bleue" (Robert Wilbur) - 7:03
 "No Lonely Nights" (Keith Jarrett) - 6:21
 "Straight, No Chaser" (Thelonious Monk) - 6:13

Disc Six: June 5, 1994 (second set) [Sunday]
 "Time After Time" (Sammy Cahn, Jule Styne) - 12:36
 "For Heaven's Sake" (Elise Bretton, Sherman Edwards, Donald Meyer) - 11:02
 "Partners" (Keith Jarrett) - 8:56
 "Desert Sun" (Keith Jarrett) - 28:32
 "How About You?" (Ralph Freed, Burton Lane) - 7:11

Personnel 
 Keith Jarrett – piano
 Gary Peacock – double bass
 Jack DeJohnette – drums

Production
 Manfred Eicher - producer
 Jan Erik Kongshaug - recording engineer
 Barbara Wojirsch - cover design

References 

Standards Trio albums
Gary Peacock live albums
Jack DeJohnette live albums
Keith Jarrett live albums
1995 live albums
Albums produced by Manfred Eicher
Albums recorded at the Blue Note Jazz Club